HOAS may refer to:

 Helsingin seudun opiskelija-asuntosäätiö, a student housing provider in Helsinki, Finland
 Higher-order abstract syntax, representing the abstract syntax of a programming language